Mickletown is a district within the village of Methley, south of Leeds, West Yorkshire, England.

The Leeds Country Way and the Trans Pennine Trail both pass Mickletown.

Location grid

External links
  Mickletown was in this parish

Places in Leeds
Rothwell, West Yorkshire